Anisocarpus scabridus, the leafy raillardiopsis, is a North American species of flowering plants in the family Asteraceae.

Distribution
It is found only in northwestern California, primarily in scree slopes at relatively high elevations in the Coast Ranges of Humboldt, Mendocino, Trinity, Lake, Tehama, and Colusa Counties. There are also a few isolated populations in the southern Cascades of northern Shasta County.

Description
Anisocarpus scabridus is a small plant rarely more than 2 inches (5 cm) high. It has blue-green leaves and flower heads containing both ray florets and disc florets.

The plant is quite different in ecology and appearance from the only other species in the genus, A. madioides. The two were classified in different genera for many years until molecular and anatomical studies in the 1990s demonstrated their close relationship.

References

External links
Calflora Database: Anisocarpus scabridus (Scabrid alpine tarplant)
 Jepson Manual eFlora (TJM2) treatment of Anisocarpus scabridus

Madieae
Endemic flora of California
Flora of the Cascade Range
Flora of the Klamath Mountains
Natural history of the California Coast Ranges
Plants described in 1905
Taxa named by Alice Eastwood